The 13th Annual Premios Juventud (Youth Awards) were broadcast by Univision on July 14, 2016.

Performers

Winners and nominees

Music

Novelas

Films

Social networks

Sports

Multiple nominations and awards

References 

Premios Juventud
Premios Juventud
Premios Juventud
Premios Juventud
Premios Juventud
Premios Juventud
Premios Juventud
2010s in Miami